Hille (Pronunciation: [ɦɪllə] ) is a hamlet of the Belgian village of Zwevezele. The hamlet is located one and a half kilometers northeast of the center of Zwevezele.

Populated places in West Flanders